The 2012 United Kingdom local elections were held across England, Scotland and Wales on 3 May 2012. Elections were held in 128 English local authorities, all 32 Scottish local authorities and 21 of the 22 Welsh unitary authorities, alongside three mayoral elections including the London mayoralty and the London Assembly. Referendums were also held in 11 English cities to determine whether or not to introduce directly elected mayors.

The BBC's projected national vote share put Labour on 38%, the Conservatives on 31%, the Liberal Democrats on 16% and others on 15%. Rallings and Thrasher of Plymouth University estimated 39% for Labour, 33% for the Conservatives, 15% for the Liberal Democrats, and 13% for others.

The inaugural election of police and crime commissioners for 41 of the 43 territorial police forces in England and Wales took place separately, in November 2012.

Electoral process 
All registered electors (British, Irish, Commonwealth and European Union citizens) who were aged 18 or over on Thursday 3 May 2012 were entitled to vote in the local elections. Those who were temporarily away from their ordinary address (for example, away working, on holiday, in student accommodation or in hospital) were also entitled to vote in the local elections, although those who had moved abroad and registered as overseas electors cannot vote in the local elections. It is possible to register to vote at more than one address (such as a university student who had a term-time address and lives at home during holidays) at the discretion of the local Electoral Register Office, but it remains an offence to vote more than once in the same local government election.

The deadline to register to vote in the election was midnight on Wednesday 18 April 2012, though anyone who qualified as an anonymous elector had until midnight on Thursday 26 April 2012 to register.

Results

Overall results - Great Britain

England

The local authorities having elections in 2012 (excluding mayoral elections) covered about 40% of the total English electorate, with 15.9 million electors entitled to vote. Turnout overall was 31.0%.

In summary, the accumulated local authority vote and seats won by political party was:

Note the equivalent of these figures may not be commonly available for other election years.
They represent the actual numbers of votes cast and should not be falsely compared to the more
commonly available figures based on the projections for the whole of Great Britain.

Metropolitan boroughs
All 36 Metropolitan boroughs had one third of their seats up for election.

Unitary authorities

Whole council up for election
Two unitary authorities that would usually have had a third of their seats up for election, actually had elections for all their seats because of the implementation of boundary changes.

One third of council up for election
In 16 English unitary authorities, one third of the council was up for election.

District councils

Whole council up for election
Four district councils that would usually have had one-third of their seats due for election, actually had full council elections as a result of the implementation of new ward boundaries.

Half of council up for election
7 district councils had half of their seats up for election.

One third of council up for election
In 63 district authorities, one third of the seats were up for election.

Mayoral elections
Three direct mayoral elections were held.

Mayoral referendums

Referendums were also held in 11 English cities to determine whether or not to introduce the position of a directly elected mayor. These polls took place in Birmingham, Bradford, Bristol, Coventry, Leeds, Manchester, Newcastle upon Tyne, Nottingham, Sheffield and Wakefield. Of these 11 cities, only Bristol chose direct election (rather than council appointment) of a mayor. In addition, the citizens of Doncaster voted on the same day to continue electing their mayors directly.

Scotland

All council seats were up for election in the 32 Scottish authorities.

Wales

In 21 out of 22 Welsh authorities, the whole council was up for election. On 17 January 2012, the Welsh Government announced that elections for Anglesey council have been postponed to May 2013.

See also

Political make-up of local councils in the United Kingdom

References

 
2012
2012 elections in the United Kingdom